Minnesota's 2nd congressional district covers the south Twin Cities metro area and contains all of Scott, Dakota, and Le Sueur counties. It also contains part of northern and eastern Rice County including the city of Northfield, as well as southern Washington County including the city of Cottage Grove. Lakeville and Eagan are the largest cities in the district. Historically, for many decades in the mid 20th century the 2nd congressional district covered the southwest corner of the state, while the 1st congressional district covered most of this part of the state.

Three of Minnesota's most important rivers run through the district, the Mississippi River, the Minnesota River, and the St. Croix River. Interstate highways I-35 E and I-35 W merge in the district in addition to the north–south thoroughfares of U.S. Routes 169, 61, and 52 and the east–west Route 212. The suburban areas in the northern part of the district blend into the rural farmland in the south. The district's economy includes agriculture, small businesses, and large corporations.

Some of the largest employers in the district are Thomson Reuters, Blue Cross and Blue Shield of Minnesota, 3M,  Cambria, and Red Wing Shoes. The district includes Pine Bend Refinery, the largest oil refinery in Minnesota, owned by Koch Industries.

The 2nd district is also home to two private liberal arts colleges: St. Olaf and Carleton, both in Northfield. Shakopee is home to Minnesota's largest amusement park, Valleyfair, as well as Canterbury Park.

Two of Minnesota's oldest cities, Hastings and Red Wing are in the district. The district hosts heritage festivals and town celebrations, such as Kolacky days in Montgomery, the Pine Island Cheese festival, and Shakopee Derby Days.

Minnesota's 2nd congressional district is currently represented by Democrat Angie Craig, who defeated incumbent Republican Jason Lewis in the 2018 election. The district is considered to be highly competitive.

Election results from statewide races

List of members representing the district

Recent elections

2002

2004

2006

2008

2010

2012

2014

2016

2018

2020

References

02
1861 establishments in Minnesota